The Tango is a light rail vehicle and tram made by Stadler Rail. It can be built as either a 100% high-floor or 70% low-floor articulated unit. It is in use in Bochum, Berlin (BVG-Class IK), Basel, Geneva, Lyon and Aarhus.

Characteristics 

The cities operating Tango are demanding the following characteristics for their rolling stock: speed (up to ), robustness, security and compatibility with the common use of infrastructure, economic (capacity adapted to the traffic and prospects for their development) as well as comfort and aesthetics. In the case of the Appenzell Railways, the light rail needs to deal also with strong gradients in the foothills south of St. Gallen.

Usage 
In Lyon, the Tango tram is serving the express line Rhônexpress linking downtown with Saint Exupéry Airport, and its TGV train station, opened in 2010.

An order of 32 vehicles has been placed by the city of Geneva in December 2009. 20 were ordered by Stuttgarter Strassenbahnen, the first one being completed in September 2012.

Appenzeller Bahnen (AB) has contracted Stadler Rail to deliver seven new Tango for use on the new Appenzell–St. Gallen–Trogen railway starting from 2017. Previously, the western line from St. Gallen to Appenzell was operated by heavy rail with a rack section.

Aarhus Letbane will receive a mix of 12 Stadler Tango (with a top speed of 100 km/h) and 14 Stadler Variobahn, with a total of 26 units.

See also 
Variobahn, a 100% low-floor tram from the same manufacturer

References

External links 
 Stadler Rail – Tango (tram)

Tram vehicles of Switzerland
Stadler Rail rolling stock
600 V DC multiple units
750 V DC multiple units